Morteza Talaie (born 1957 in Isfahan, Iran) is an Iranian retired commander of the Police forces. He was appointed as Tehran's Police forces commander in 2000 and was commander until he retired in 2005.

After his retirement, he nominated himself as a candidate in 2006 local elections and was elected as Tehran's city councilman. He was elected as the council's vice chairman on 3 September 2013.

Biography
He was born in 1957 in Isfahan, Iran, in a crowded 10-person family. He graduated in political science. He got married in 1979 and has three children. He was appointed Chief Brigadier of Isfahan Police forces in 1992 and was in office until 2000, when he was appointed as Tehran's Chief Brigadier.

References

1957 births
Living people
Politicians from Isfahan
Vice Chairmen of City Council of Tehran
Progress and Justice Population of Islamic Iran politicians
Secretaries-General of political parties in Iran
Alliance of Builders of Islamic Iran politicians
Tehran Councillors 2013–2017
Tehran Councillors 2007–2013
Islamic Revolutionary Guard Corps personnel of the Iran–Iraq War
Iranian police officers